St. Paul School of Princeton is a Catholic K-8 parochial school attached to St. Paul's Catholic Church in Princeton, New Jersey.  It traces its origins to the founding of the parish in 1850, when classes began in the church basement.  The Sisters of Mercy took responsibility for the school in 1878 and a dedicated building was opened at  218 Nassau Street in 1880.  The current structure dates to 1930 and the school is home to around 400 students and 30 faculty.

Gallery

References

External links
 Official website

Schools in Princeton, New Jersey
Private elementary schools in New Jersey
Private middle schools in New Jersey
Private schools in Mercer County, New Jersey
Roman Catholic Diocese of Trenton
Catholic elementary schools in New Jersey